Ştefan Sameş (14 October 1951 – 17 July 2011) was a Romanian professional football player and manager.

Career
Born in Dobroiești, Sameş began playing football for the youth side of Steaua Bucuresti. He made his Romanian first division debut at age 19, playing for FC Universitatea Craiova while on loan from Steaua during 1971. After two seasons in Craiova, he returned to Steaua and made 274 league appearances for the club and was named Romanian footballer of the year in 1979.

Sameş made 46 appearances for the senior Romania national football team, including eleven FIFA World Cup qualifying matches. He also has three caps for Romania's Olympic team.

After he retired from playing football, Sameş became a football manager and coached Steaua's youth academy from 1992 until 2011.

Honours

Personal
On 17 July 2011, Sameş died in a Bucharest hospital after suffering from cancer for six months.

References

External links

Interview with Ştefan Sameş ziarulring.ro 

1951 births
2011 deaths
Deaths from cancer in Romania
Romanian footballers
Olympic footballers of Romania
Romania international footballers
FC Steaua București players
CS Universitatea Craiova players
FC Rapid București players
FCV Farul Constanța players
Association football defenders
Liga I players
FC Universitatea Cluj managers
Romanian football managers